Andrea Lane Lloyd (born September 2, 1965) is an American former professional basketball player, a 2007 inductee into the Women's Basketball Hall of Fame, and previous television analyst for the Minnesota Lynx.  Currently she is working as a television analyst for the MTN sports network with the Mountain West Conference.

Early years
Born in Moscow, Idaho, Lloyd moved to Alaska with her family at age 12 and moved back to Moscow three years later, in the middle of her sophomore year. A three-time Idaho high school player of the year,  she led Moscow High School to state championships in 1981 and 1982; she graduated in 1983 and was a Parade magazine All-American.

Lloyd played college basketball at the University of Texas in Austin, where she was one of the top players in the nation. As a junior, she helped lead the Longhorns to an undefeated season and a national title in 1986. In her senior season, defending champion Texas, under head coach Jody Conradt, had only one loss entering the 1987 tournament, but fell in the Final Four to runner-up Louisiana Tech.

USA Basketball
Prior to her junior year at Texas, Lloyd played for the USA team at the 1985 World University Games in Kobe, Japan. The team brought home a silver medal, after falling to the USSR. Team USA trailed by 18 points at one time, mounted a comeback attempt but fell short, losing 87–81. Lloyd averaged 6.0 points per game.

Lloyd won gold at the 1988 Olympics in Seoul, Korea, as a member of the USA women's basketball team.  She was also a member of the USA team for the Pan American Games in both 1987 and 1991, winning gold and bronze medals, respectively.

Lloyd was named to the USA national team and competed in the 1994 World Championships, held in June 1994 in Sydney, Australia. The team was coached by Tara VanDerveer, and won their first six games, when they faced Brazil. In a closely contested, high scoring game, Brazil hit ten of ten free throws in the final minute to secure a 110–107 victory. The USA won a close final game against Australia 100–95 to earn the bronze medal. Lloyd averaged 8.3 points per game.

Professional career
Lloyd-Curry played in the American Basketball League with the Columbus Quest from 1996 through 1998. With the dissolution of that league, she began her WNBA career with the Minnesota Lynx in 1999. She tore the anterior cruciate ligament in her left knee in 2000 on June 30, which effectively ended her playing career.

WNBA career statistics

Regular season

|-
| align="left" | 1999
| align="left" | Minnesota
| 32 || 31 || 28.1 || .375 || .333 || .756 || 4.3 || 2.8 || 0.9 || 0.4 || 1.9 || 6.7
|-
| align="left" | 2000
| align="left" | Minnesota
| 14 || 2 || 23.8 || .382 || .344 || .706 || 3.1 || 1.6 || 0.9 || 0.1 || 1.7 || 5.4
|-
| align="left" | Career
| align="left" | 2 years, 1 team
| 46 || 33 || 26.8 || .377 || .336 || .742 || 3.9 || 2.5 || 0.9 || 0.3 || 1.9 || 6.3

Post-playing career

In 2020, Lloyd was named a television analyst for Texas Longhorns women's basketball games on Longhorn Network.

References

External links

Women's Basketball Hall of Fame profile
Texas Longhorns bio

1965 births
Living people
All-American college women's basketball players
American expatriate basketball people in Italy
American women's basketball players
Basketball players at the 1987 Pan American Games
Basketball players at the 1988 Summer Olympics
Basketball players at the 1991 Pan American Games
Basketball players from Idaho
Columbus Quest players
Medalists at the 1988 Summer Olympics
Minnesota Lynx draft picks
Minnesota Lynx players
Olympic gold medalists for the United States in basketball
Pan American Games bronze medalists for the United States
Pan American Games gold medalists for the United States
Pan American Games medalists in basketball
Parade High School All-Americans (girls' basketball)
People from Moscow, Idaho
Power forwards (basketball)
Texas Longhorns women's basketball players
Universiade gold medalists for the United States
Universiade medalists in basketball
Medalists at the 1985 Summer Universiade
Medalists at the 1987 Pan American Games
Medalists at the 1991 Pan American Games
United States women's national basketball team players